Fabian of the Yard is a British police procedural television series based on the real-life memoirs of Scotland Yard detective Robert Fabian, made by the BBC and broadcast between November 1954 and February 1956. It is considered the earliest police procedural to be made for British TV, sharing many points of commonality with the U.S. series Dragnet which had gone on air in 1951.

There were 36 episodes in total, of 30 minutes each.  The first 30 were broadcast consecutively on Saturday evenings between 13 November 1954 and 22 June 1955, with the exceptions of Christmas Day and New Year's Day which happened to fall on a Saturday.  For unknown reasons, the final six episodes were held back, and were later broadcast intermittently between November 1955 and February 1956.  The series was later broadcast in the U.S. under the titles Fabian of Scotland Yard or Patrol Car.

Synopsis
Apart from Bruce Seton, who played the eponymous Fabian in every episode, the series had relatively few recurring characters in comparison with later British police series.  Only Robert Raglan as Detective Sergeant Wyatt was in any way a regular, appearing in 15 episodes.  No other cast member featured in more than six episodes, as the particular skills of their character were called on to assist in a case germane to their speciality, such as the laboratory expert, the psychiatrist, the pathologist or the graphologist. There were guest appearances from well-known actors such as Kathleen Byron, Elspet Gray, Kieron Moore and Michael Craig, but for the most part the cast consisted of relative unknowns.

Fabian of the Yard was one of the earliest BBC series to be shot on film, with each episode featuring voiceover narration from Seton. Each case was a dramatisation of a genuine crime which had taken place in the London area between the 1920s and the early 1950s, usually, although not invariably, a murder. Many of the cases featured had made national headlines in their day, such as "Little Girl", based on the murder of an East London schoolgirl which had shocked the country in 1939. Each episode finished with an epilogue in which a shot of Seton at his desk dissolved into a shot of the real-life Fabian at the same desk, who then explained to viewers what had happened to the real criminal from the case they had just been watching.

Episodes 
 "The Extra Bullet" (13 November 1954)
 "The Unwanted Man" (20 November 1954)
 "The Skeleton in the Closet" (27 November 1954)
 "Bombs in Piccadilly" (4 December 1954)
 "Death on the Portsmouth Road" (11 December 1954)
 "The Actress and the Kidnap Plot" (18 December 1954)
 "Against the Evidence" (8 January 1955)
 "Murder in Soho" (15 January 1955)
 "Bride of the Fires" (22 January 1955)
 "The Troubled Wife" (29 January 1955)
 "Nell Gwynn's Tear" (5 February 1955)
 "The Vanishing Cat" (12 February 1955)
 "Written in the Dust" (19 February 1955)
 "The Purple Mouse" (26 February 1955)
 "The King's Hat" (5 March 1955)
 "Little Girl" (12 March 1955)
 "The Coward" (19 March 1955)
 "The Lost Boy" (30 March 1955)
 "The Executioner" (6 April 1955)
 "The Poison Machine" (13 April 1955)
 "The Golden Peacock" (20 April 1955)
 "The Lover's Knot" (27 April 1955)
 "The Man from Blackpool" (4 May 1955)
 "Robbery in the Museum" (11 May 1955)
 "The Deadly Pocket Handkerchief" (18 May 1955)
 "The Hand of Terror" (25 May 1955)
 "Pin-Point Signature" (1 June 1955)
 "The Innocent Victims" (8 June 1955)
 "The Jade Blade" (15 June 1955)
 "April Fool" (22 June 1955)
 "No Alibi" (12 November 1955)
 "Escort to Death" (19 November 1955)
 "The Sixth Dagger" (26 November 1955)
 "The Ribbon Trap" (17 January 1956)
 "Cocktail Girl" (30 January 1956)
 "The Masterpiece" (6 February 1956)

Film
Three early episodes – Death on the Portsmouth Road (about a serial killer), The Actress and the Kidnap Plot (abduction and extortion), and Bombs in Piccadilly (IRA terrorism) – were put together and released to cinemas as a portmanteau feature in early 1955, reflecting the fact that this was still a time when a majority of the British population did not have a home television.

References

External links
 
 
 

1954 British television series debuts
1956 British television series endings
1950s British police procedural television series
Television shows set in London
Television series based on actual events